Mid Durham was a county constituency represented in the House of Commons of the Parliament of the United Kingdom. It elected one Member of Parliament (MP) by the first past the post system of election from 1885 to 1918.

History

Creation 
The constituency was created by the Redistribution of Seats Act 1885, when the North Durham and South Durham county divisions were replaced by eight new single-member county constituencies. These were Barnard Castle, Bishop Auckland, Chester-le-Street, Houghton-le-Spring, Jarrow, Mid Durham, North West Durham and South East Durham. In addition there were seven County Durham borough constituencies.

Boundaries 
The Sessional Division of Durham and Willington (including all the parish of Shadforth and excluding all the parish of Moorhouse) and the Municipal Borough of Durham.

See map on Vision of Britain website. 

NB: 1) Boundary Commission proposed name was "Brancepeth"

2) Included only non-resident freeholders in the parliamentary borough of Durham

Abolition 
The seat was abolished for the 1918 general election, when its contents were distributed as follows:

 Parish of Witton Gilbert to Chester-le-Street;
 Remaining northern areas, including Brandon and Willington, to the newly created county division of Durham, which also absorbed the abolished parliamentary borough;
 South-western areas, including Brandon and Willington, to the new constituency of Spennymoor; and
 South-eastern areas, including Ferryhill, to the new constituency of Sedgefield.

Members of Parliament

Elections

Elections in the 1880s

Elections in the 1890s

Elections in the 1900s

Elections in the 1910s

General Election 1914–15:

Another General Election was required to take place before the end of 1915. The political parties had been making preparations for an election to take place and by July 1914, the following candidates had been selected; 
Liberal: Samuel Galbraith 
Unionist: 
Labour: Joseph Batey

See also
History of parliamentary constituencies and boundaries in Durham

References 

 

Parliamentary constituencies in County Durham (historic)
Constituencies of the Parliament of the United Kingdom established in 1885
Constituencies of the Parliament of the United Kingdom disestablished in 1918